Yevhen Yakovlev (born 30 April 1977) is a Ukrainian short track speed skater. He competed in two events at the 1998 Winter Olympics.

References

1977 births
Living people
Ukrainian male short track speed skaters
Olympic short track speed skaters of Ukraine
Short track speed skaters at the 1998 Winter Olympics
Sportspeople from Kharkiv